William Witham (or Wytham) was incumbent at St Marylebone until 12 November 1454, when he exchanged the office for that of Archdeacon of Stow. He was then Archdeacon of Leicester (from 1458), Dean of Arches (from ) and Dean of Wells (from 1467) until his death before 1473.

References

Archdeacons of Leicester
Archdeacons of Stow
Deans of Wells
15th-century English clergy